The Tarwin River is a perennial river of the West Gippsland catchment, located in the South Gippsland region of the Australian state of Victoria. It flows south from the Strzlecki Ranges and discharges in the eastern reaches of Anderson Inlet, a shallow estuary connected to Bass Strait.

Course and features

The west branch of the river rises as a number of tributaries on the southern slopes of the Strzelecki Ranges at the south of Mount Worth State Park.

The lower reaches of the Tarwin River can be affected by tidal influences. From its highest elevation including the east and west branches of the river, the Tarwin River descends  over its combined  course.

Etymology
In the Aboriginal Boonwurrung language the river is given two names: Tarwin, meaning "thirsty", and Toulerm, meaning "gum".

It is a popular fishing river, with the river running with a species of fish known as "elephant fish" every season.

The river was named from an Aboriginal word .

See also

 List of rivers of Australia

References

External links
 
 

West Gippsland catchment
Rivers of Gippsland (region)